Overland Trail is an American Western series starring William Bendix and Doug McClure which aired on NBC from February 7 to June 6, 1960.

Synopsis
Bendix portrayed Frederick Thomas "Fred" Kelly, fictitious superintendent of the Overland Stage Company. McClure appeared as Frank "Flip" Flippen, Bendix's young associate.

Overland Trail aired opposite Lassie and Dennis the Menace on CBS and Walt Disney Presents and Maverick on ABC. Overland Trail left the air on September 11, 1960, after summer rebroadcasts. It was replaced by the last season of NBC's Shirley Temple's Storybook.

Notable guest stars
Notable guest stars included:

 Mario Alcalde
 John Anderson
 Claude Akins 
 Lynn Bari
 Rayford Barnes
 Whitney Blake 
 Russ Bender
 James Best 
 Chet Brandenburg
 Robert Bray
 John Carradine
 Steve Conte
 Walter Coy
 Frank Dekova
 Alan Dexter
 Don Dubbins
 Frank Ferguson
 Dianne Foster
 Kelton Garwood
 Robert Griffin
 Ron Hayes
 Rex Holman
 Rodolfo Hoyos Jr.
 Lang Jeffries
 Ray Kellogg
 Werner Klemperer
 Robert Loggia
 BarBara Luna
 Barton MacLane
 Ted Mapes
 John Marley
 Lucy Marlow
 Ken Mayer
 Mercedes McCambridge 
 Sean McClory
 John McIntire
 Denny Scott Miller
 Gerald Mohr
 Mary Tyler Moore
 Read Morgan
 Jimmy Noel
 Gregg Palmer
 Slim Pickens
 Andrew Prine 
 Judson Pratt 
 Denver Pyle
 Gilman Rankin
 Karen Sharpe
 Quentin Sondergaard
 Boyd Stockman
 Kelly Thordsen
 Eddy Waller
 Adam West
 Peter Whitney
 Robert J. Wilke
 Tony Young

Episodes

Home media
On February 14, 2012, Timeless Media Group released Overland Trail- The Complete Series on DVD in Region 1.

References

External links 
 

1960 American television series debuts
1960 American television series endings
1960s American drama television series
Black-and-white American television shows
English-language television shows
NBC original programming
1960s Western (genre) television series